In aspect and functional programming,  advice describes a class of functions which modify other functions when the latter are run; it is a certain function, method or procedure that is to be applied at a given join point of a program.

Use
The practical use of advice functions is generally to modify or otherwise extend the behavior of functions which cannot be easily modified or extended. The Emacspeak Emacs-addon makes extensive use of advice: it must modify thousands of existing Emacs modules and functions such that it can produce audio output for the blind corresponding to the visual presentation, but it would be infeasible to copy all of them and redefine them to produce audio output in addition to their normal outputs; so, the Emacspeak programmers define advice functions which run before and after.

Another Emacs example; suppose after one corrected a misspelled word through ispell, one wanted to re-spellcheck the entire buffer. ispell-word offers no such functionality, even if the spellchecked word is used a thousand times. One could track down the definition of ispell-word, copy it into one's Emacs, and write the additional functionality, but this is tedious, prone to broken-ness (the Emacs version will get out of sync with the actual Ispell Elisp module,  if it even works out of its home). What one wants is fairly simple: just to run another command after ispell-word runs. Using advice functions, it can be done as simply as this:

 (defadvice ispell (after advice)
   (flyspell-buffer))
 (ad-activate 'ispell t)

Implementations
A form of advices were part of C with Classes in the late 1970s and early 1980s, namely functions called call and return defined in a class, which were called before (respectively, after) member functions of the class. However, these were dropped from C++.

Advices are part of the Common Lisp Object System (CLOS), as :before, :after, and :around methods, which are combined with the primary method under "standard method combination".

Common Lisp implementations provide advice functionality (in addition to the standard method combination for CLOS) as extensions. LispWorks supports advising functions, macros and CLOS methods.

EmacsLisp added advice-related code in version 19.28, 1994.

History 
The following is taken from a discussion at the mailing list aosd-discuss. Pascal Costanza contributed the following:

The term "advice" goes back to the term advising as introduced by Warren Teitelman in his PhD thesis in 1966. Here is a quote from Chapter 3 of his thesis:

Advising is the basic innovation in the model, and in the PILOT system. Advising consists of inserting new procedures at any or all of the entry or exit points to a particular procedure (or class of procedures). The procedures inserted are called "advice procedures" or simply "advice".

Since each piece of advice is itself a procedure, it has its own entries and exits. In particular, this means that the execution of advice can cause the procedure that it modifies to be bypassed completely, e.g., by specifying as an exit from the advice one of the exits from the original procedure; or the advice may change essential variables and continue with the computation so that the original procedure is executed, but with modified variables. Finally, the advice may not alter the execution or affect the original procedure at all, e.g., it may merely perform some additional computation such as printing a message or recording history. Since advice can be conditional, the decision as to what is to be done can depend on the results of the computation up to that point.

The principal advantage of advising is that the user need not be concerned about the details of the actual changes in his program, nor the internal representation of advice. He can treat the procedure to be advised _as a unit_, a single block, and make changes to it without concern for the particulars of this block. This may be contrasted with editing in which the programmer must be cognizant of the internal structure of the procedure.

"Advising" found its way into BBN Lisp and later into Xerox PARC's Interlisp.

It also found its way to Flavors, the first object-oriented extension to Lisp developed at MIT. They were subsumed under the notion of method combination.

Since method combination and macros are closely related, it's also interesting to note that the first macro system was described in 1963, three years before Warren Teitelman's PhD thesis.

See also 
 Function decorator (w.r.t. Python)
 Aspect-oriented software development#Advice bodies

Notes
Gregor Kiczales comments the above as follows:

References

External links
 Teitelman's PhD thesis (AITR-221)
 Interlisp reference manual from 1974
 "Origin of Advice"

Aspect-oriented programming
Lisp (programming language)
Programming constructs
Articles with example Lisp (programming language) code